Avirup Das (born 12 April 1988), known under his stage name of Bunty's Percussion, is a Kolkata based percussionist. He is one of the founder members of renowned Bengali folk band Fakira  He plays many instruments including Drums, Congas, Timbale, Djembe, Cajon, Darabuka, and Kanjira, as well as many more. He was featured as the percussionist Drummer at Zee Bangla Saregamapa for music producer Suvam Moitra in the year of 2018 -19 & 2020-21.

Line up
Fakira  
Project Maya  
Bunty's Percussion Methodize 
Sahana Bajpaie Live (Ex Percussionist)
Nikhita Gandhi Live (Kolkata) (Ex Percussionist)
 Samantak Sinha (Ex Percussionist)
 Soumyojit Sourendro (Ex Percussionist)

Audio Albums
Itorpona  By Fakira - Inerco.
Project Maya - Asha Audio
Blendz  ft. Anup jalota - , Times Music.
Bumerang – Dhoom Music
Rabindranath Chhara By Ananya – Aatman Audio.
Shikawr By Sahana Bajpaie – Cozmik Harmony
Ja Bawlo Tai Bawlo" By Sahana Bajpaie - Inerco
 Baba Tomake By Various Artist – Aatman Audio
 Mon Bandhibi Kamnone By Sahana Bajpaie – Inerco

Mega Serial
Nakshi Kathar Maath
Ranu Pelo Lottery 
Aparajita Apu ( Suvam Moitra)

Filmography

Theatre Live Music
PS Bhalobasha (4th Bell Theatres) with Timir Biswas

References

External links
 

1988 births
Indian drummers
Living people
21st-century drummers